RSTV or RStV may refer to:

Rajya Sabha TV, Indian television channel owned and operated by Rajya Sabha
Rivers State Television, television station in Port Harcourt city, Rivers State, Nigeria
Redemption Song (TV series), American reality television show
Rundfunkstaatsvertrag, abbreviated as RStV, nationwide law for radio station and television licensing in Germany